The 1925 Lafayette Brown and White football team was an American football team that represented Lehigh University during the 1925 college football season.  In its first season under head coach Percy Wendell, the team compiled a 3–5–1 record. The team played its home games at Taylor Stadium in Bethlehem, Pennsylvania.

Schedule

References

Lehigh
Lehigh Mountain Hawks football seasons
Lehigh football